"Taki Taki" is an English-Spanish song by French DJ and record producer DJ Snake, featuring vocals from American singer Selena Gomez, Puerto Rican singer Ozuna, and American rapper Cardi B. The song was released on 28 September 2018 as the second single from DJ Snake's second studio album Carte Blanche (2019). It was written by DJ Snake, Gomez, Ozuna, Cardi B, Ava Brignol, Jorden Thorpe, Juan Vasquez and Vicente Saavedra. Ozuna opens the moombahton and reggaeton song in Spanish, while Cardi B and Gomez follow in English and Spanish.

The song's music video, directed by Colin Tilley, was released on 9 October 2018 and features the four artists dancing in a lava-drenched crater of a volcano. The single reached number one in sixteen countries including Argentina, Portugal and Spain. It received a Diamond certification in France, quadruple Platinum in the US, and won nine music awards. "Taki Taki" made Cardi B the first female rapper to top the Spotify Global chart, extended her record as the first female rapper with multiple billion-streamers on the platform, and made Ozuna the artist with the most one billion-view videos on YouTube. It has amassed over two billion views on the platform.

Background
In July 2018, Cardi B confirmed a collaboration with DJ Snake, Ozuna and a third mystery guest. The following month, Selena Gomez and Cardi B teased a behind-the-scenes look at the song's music video shoot, which was filmed in Los Angeles. On 17 September 2018, DJ Snake announced the release date.

Composition
"Taki Taki" is a moombahton and reggaeton song. The whistle sample is from Sounds of KSHMR Vol.2. It runs for three minutes and thirty-two seconds. Ozuna opens the track and provides the hook, while Cardi B and Gomez follow performing in English and Spanish. Lyrically, the song sees the performers expressing their ways to seduce and interpreting what their partners are thinking.

Music videos

The music video for "Taki Taki" premiered on 9 October 2018 on DJ Snake's YouTube channel. The video was directed by Colin Tilley. A short teaser clip was shown at the 2018 American Music Awards. The video is set in a post-apocalyptic world. The clip transitions with various landscapes showing the quartet together with a volcano in the background and in the solo scenes. These scenes include DJ Snake out in the storm near a Range Rover, Ozuna in a women-filled pit, Cardi B wearing a black bodysuit covered by a black cape accompanied by dancers, and Gomez in a green monochromatic outfit in the forest. It became the fifth fastest video of 2018 to reach 100 million views, and ranked among the top 10 fastest overall. "Taki Taki" made Ozuna the artist with the most 1 billion-view videos on YouTube, with over seven videos. As of August 2022, the video has received over 2.3 billion views on YouTube.
 
A pixel video for "Taki Taki" was released on 11 December 2018 on YouTube, which featured animated pixel versions of the four artists dancing in various backgrounds. The lyrics "Booty explota como nagasaki" (Booty blows up like Nagasaki) was criticized by Japanese media for belittling the atomic bombing of Nagasaki and the experience of its survivors. The lyrics were changed to "Booty explota como saki saki" (Booty blows up like saki saki), as requested by Universal Music LLC.  This change in the lyrics was made in the official video.

Commercial performance
In the United States, "Taki Taki" debuted at number one on the Hot Latin Songs, where Ozuna replaced himself at the top with "Te Boté", while bowing at number 27 on the Billboard Hot 100. It eventually reached number 11 on the Hot 100 during its fourth week. It became Gomez's 16th consecutive top 40 entry on the Hot 100, the longest active run of any artist. In the US Latin Airplay chart, it became the first number one for both DJ Snake and Gomez, the eighth for Ozuna and third for Cardi B.

In addition, "Taki Taki" reached number one in Argentina, Bolivia, Colombia, the Dominican Republic, El Salvador, Greece, Guatemala, Honduras, Israel, Nicaragua, Panama, Peru, Portugal, Spain and Venezuela; the song also reached the top 10 in Belgium, Canada, Chile, Costa Rica, the Czech Republic, Denmark, Ecuador, France, Germany, Hungary, Italy, Malaysia, the Netherlands, Paraguay, the Philippines, Romania, Singapore, Slovakia, Sweden and Switzerland; as well as the top 20 in Austria, Finland, Ireland, Lebanon, New Zealand, Norway, the United Kingdom and the United States.

The song had a strong international impact, reaching the top of the Spotify Global 50 chart where it has stayed for over four weeks. This made Cardi B the first female rapper to achieve such a feat. It became DJ Snake's third song to reach a billion streams on Spotify, as well as Cardi's third and Gomez's and Ozuna's first. Cardi B extended her record as the first female rapper with multiple billion-streamers. As of November 2018, the song has reached number one on the official charts of 15 countries and the top 10 of 33 countries around the world.

Live performances
Ozuna and Cardi B performed the song together live for the first time at the Dominican Republic's Electric Paradise Festival on 22 December 2018. Ozuna also performed the song at the 2019 Premios Lo Nuestro. On 15 March 2019, Ozuna performed the song in a medley alongside "Baila Baila Baila" on The Tonight Show Starring Jimmy Fallon. DJ Snake, Ozuna, Cardi B and Selena Gomez performed the song at Coachella Valley Music and Arts Festival in 2019. Ozuna performed the song at the Celebrating America Inauguration Special in 2021.

Awards and nominations

Track listing
Digital download
"Taki Taki" – 3:32

CD single
"Taki Taki" – 3:33
"Magenta Riddim" – 3:15

Charts

Weekly charts

Monthly charts

Year-end charts

Decade-end charts

Certifications

Release history

See also
List of Airplay 100 number ones of the 2010s
List of Billboard Hot Latin Songs and Latin Airplay number ones of 2018
List of Billboard Hot Latin Songs and Latin Airplay number ones of 2019
List of number-one singles of 2018 (Spain)
List of Billboard Argentina Hot 100 number-one singles of 2018
 List of airplay number-one hits of the 2010s (Argentina)

References

External links
 
 Vertical video on Spotify

2018 singles
2018 songs
Cardi B songs
DJ Snake songs
Selena Gomez songs
Ozuna (singer) songs
Geffen Records singles
Macaronic songs
Spanglish songs
Reggaeton songs
Moombahton songs
Songs written by Cardi B
Songs written by Selena Gomez
Music videos directed by Colin Tilley
Songs written by DJ Snake
Number-one singles in Greece
Number-one singles in Portugal
Number-one singles in Romania
Number-one singles in Spain
Argentina Hot 100 number-one singles
Songs written by Pardison Fontaine
Songs written by Ozuna (singer)